The ferruginous flycatcher (Muscicapa ferruginea) is a species of bird in the family Muscicapidae.

It is found in Bangladesh, Bhutan, China, Indonesia, Japan, Laos, Malaysia, Myanmar, Nepal, the Philippines, India, Singapore, Taiwan, Thailand, and Vietnam. Its natural habitat is subtropical or tropical moist montane forests.

References

ferruginous flycatcher
Birds of Eastern Himalaya
Birds of Central China
Birds of Yunnan
ferruginous flycatcher
Taxonomy articles created by Polbot